The Winchester Reading Prize, endowed in 1867 by John Noble, is awarded at the University of Cambridge for the public reading of passages:

 of classical English Prose and Poetry;
 of the Old and New Testament and the English Liturgy; and
 of a work or portion of a work of some standard English Divine.

References 

Awards established in 1867
Awards and prizes of the University of Cambridge
1867 establishments in England
Public speaking